William 'Bill' John Cornehls (born 1960) is a former Australian international lawn bowler.

Bowls career
Cornehls won the Australian Singles Championship in 2000.

He won a gold medal in the inaugural triples competition at the 2006 Commonwealth Games in Victoria (Australia) with Mark Casey and Wayne Turley.
 
Two years later he won the silver medal in the fours with Nathan Rice, Wayne Turley and Mark Casey at the 2008 World Outdoor Bowls Championship in Christchurch. Shortly afterwards he announced his retirement.

He has won three gold medals at the Asia Pacific Bowls Championships.

References

External links
 
 
 

1960 births
Australian male bowls players
Living people
Commonwealth Games medallists in lawn bowls
Commonwealth Games gold medallists for Australia
Bowls players at the 2006 Commonwealth Games
20th-century Australian people
Medallists at the 2006 Commonwealth Games